The 1821 Norfolk and Long Island Hurricane was one of four known tropical cyclones that have made landfall in New York City. Another, even more intense hurricane in pre-Columbian times (sometime between 1278 and 1438) left evidence that was detected in South Jersey by paleotempestological research. The third was the 1893 New York hurricane, and the fourth was Hurricane Irene in 2011.

It moved ashore near Wilmington, North Carolina, and passed near Norfolk, Virginia before moving through the Delmarva Peninsula and New Jersey just inland. On September 3, the hurricane struck approximately near Jamaica Bay, which later became part of New York City, and on September 4 it was observed over New England. This was just 6 years after the destructive Great September Gale of 1815.

Meteorological history
A tropical cyclone was first observed on September 1 off the southeast coast of the United States. Initially, it was believed to be the same storm that struck Guadeloupe on the same day, though subsequent research indicated there were two separate storms. The hurricane tracked by the Bahamas while tracking generally northward, and it attained major hurricane status over the western Atlantic Ocean. Late on September 2, the hurricane made landfall near Wilmington, North Carolina and later turned to the northeast to cross the Pamlico Sound.

The hurricane accelerated northeastward, and passed over the Hampton Roads area early on September 3. After crossing the Chesapeake Bay, the cyclone traversed the Delmarva Peninsula near the Atlantic coastline, and at around 1500 UTC the eye passed directly over Cape Henlopen, Delaware; a thirty-minute period of calm was reported. It continued across the Delaware Bay and later passed over Cape May, New Jersey, where a fifteen-minute calm was reported. Modern researchers estimate it was a Category 3 or Category 4 hurricane upon striking New Jersey, one of the few hurricanes to hit the state. Moving ashore at very low tide, it paralleled the state's coastline just inland, and after exiting into Lower New York Bay the hurricane made landfall on New York City at around 1930 UTC on September 3; this makes it the only major hurricane to directly hit the city. A minimal hurricane in 1893 also made landfall on what later became part of New York City. The hurricane continued northeastward through New England, and after entering Massachusetts on September 4 its exact path was unknown; one researcher estimated the cyclone tracked northeastward until losing its identity over southeastern Maine, while another assessed the storm as passing far to the west of Maine.

Based on the arrangement of effects in New England, meteorologist William C. Redfield deduced that the wind field and center of tropical cyclones are circular; previously the winds were believed to be in a straight line.

Impact

In North Carolina, a powerful storm surge flooded large portions of Portsmouth Island; residents estimated the island would have been completely under water had the worst of the storm lasted for two more hours. Strong winds occurred across eastern North Carolina, resulting in at least 76 destroyed houses. Numerous people were killed in Currituck.

The strongest winds of the hurricane lasted for about an hour in southeastern Virginia, after which the storm rapidly abated. Several houses were completely destroyed, with many others receiving moderate to severe damage. The winds destroyed most of the roof of the courthouse, and uprooted trees across the region; fallen tree limbs damaged a stone bridge in Norfolk. The hurricane produced a strong storm surge along the Virginia coastline, which reached 10 feet (3 m) at Pungoteague on the Delmarva Peninsula. The storm surge, which reached several hundred yards inland, destroyed two bridges and flooded many warehouses along the Elizabeth River. Along the eastern shore, the storm surge flooded barrier islands along the Atlantic coastline, causing severe crop damage and downing many trees. Several houses were destroyed, and at Pungoteague the impact of the hurricane was described as "unexampled destruction"; five people drowned in Chincoteague. Considered one of the most violent hurricanes on record in the Mid-Atlantic, the hurricane caused $200,000 in damage in Virginia (1821 USD, $3.1 million 2007 USD).

Gale-force winds affected the Delmarva Peninsula; on Poplar Island in Talbot County, Maryland, winds peaked at 1600 UTC on September 3. The strongest winds were confined to the Atlantic coastline, with outer rainbands producing heavy rainfall in Washington, D.C. and Baltimore. Fierce winds were observed in Cape Henlopen, Delaware, with the strongest gales occurring after the eye passed over the area.

Upon making landfall on Cape May, New Jersey, the cyclone produced a 5-foot (1.5 m) storm surge on the Delaware Bay side of the city. Lasting for several hours, the hurricane-force winds were described as "[blowing] with great violence", causing widespread devastation across the region. In Little Egg Harbor, the hurricane damaged to the port. Strong winds reached as far inland as Philadelphia, where winds of over  downed trees and chimneys; in the city, precipitation accrued to 3.92 inches (99.6 mm). Further to the north, the hurricane destroyed a windmill at Bergen Point, New Jersey. Though the hurricane struck at low tide, it produced a storm surge of over 29 feet (9 m) along several portions of the New Jersey coastline, causing significant overwash.

The hurricane produced a storm surge of 13 feet (4 m) in only one hour at Battery Park, a record only broken 191 years later by Hurricane Sandy. Manhattan Island was completely flooded to Canal Street; one hurricane researcher remarked that the storm surge flooding would have been much worse, had the hurricane not struck at low tide. However, few deaths were reported in the city, since the flooding affected neighborhoods much less populated than today. The hurricane brought light rainfall as it passed New York City, though strong winds left severe damage across the city. High tides occurred along the Hudson River. Strong waves and winds blew many ships ashore along Long Island. One ship sank, killing 17 people. Along Long Island, the winds destroyed several buildings and left crops destroyed.

In New England, the hurricane produced widespread gale-force winds, with damage greatest in Connecticut.  The Black Rock Harbor Light in Black Rock, Connecticut, was destroyed on September 21. Elsewhere in the state, the winds damaged or destroyed churches, houses and small buildings. Moderate crop damage to fruit was reported as well. Strong winds extended into eastern Massachusetts, though little damage was reported in the Boston area. Hurricane-force winds reached as far north as Maine.

Historical context
The Swiss Re insurance company estimates that a hurricane with the exact track of the 1821 storm would cause $107 billion in direct property damage in 2014. Damage would reach over $1 billion in Atlantic and Ocean counties in New Jersey and New Haven, and Hartford counties in Connecticut. Damage would reach over $2 billion in Nassau and Suffolk counties on Long Island, as well as Fairfield County, Connecticut. Indirect losses, including lost tax revenue and lower real estate, would reach nearly $250 billion nationwide for a similar storm. The damage would be far greater than what occurred during Hurricane Sandy in 2012, which caused $65 billion in damage in the country when it struck New Jersey.

See also

 List of North Carolina hurricanes (pre-1900)
 List of New Jersey hurricanes
 List of New York hurricanes
 List of New England hurricanes
List of Delaware hurricanes

References
 Historical Sketches of the Town of Warner, New Hampshire (1832)

 (1821)
Category 4 Atlantic hurricanes
Norfolk and Long Island Hurricane
Hurricanes in North Carolina
Hurricanes in Virginia
Hurricanes in Maryland
Hurricanes in Delaware
Hurricanes in New Jersey
Hurricanes in New York (state)
Hurricane 1821
Hurricanes in New England
Norfolk And Long Island Hurricane
Hurricanes in Washington, D.C.
Norfolk And Long Island Hurricane
Hurricane